Oscar Tshiebwe (born 27 November 1999) is a Congolese college basketball player for the Kentucky Wildcats of the Southeastern Conference (SEC). He previously played for the West Virginia Mountaineers. In 2022, Tshiebwe was the consensus national player of the year.

Early life
Tshiebwe grew up in Lubumbashi, Democratic Republic of the Congo. He played soccer as a child but was encouraged to start basketball because of his above-average height. Tshiebwe trained by running on hills and on a mountain near his hometown. He later attended a basketball camp led by Congolese National Basketball Association (NBA) player Bismack Biyombo, who helped advance his career. Tshiebwe did not start playing basketball until May 2014.

High school career
Tshiebwe moved to the United States in November 2015, before his freshman year of high school, attending Mountain Mission School in Grundy, Virginia. Entering his junior year, he transferred to Kennedy Catholic High School in Hermitage, Pennsylvania. As a junior, Tshiebwe averaged 21.1 points per game and led his team to a Pennsylvania Interscholastic Athletic Association (PIAA) Class 1A title. He earned Class 1A All-State first team honors. In his senior season, Tshiebwe averaged 23.4 points, 18 rebounds, and five blocks per game, leading Kennedy Catholic to a 24–3 record and the PIAA Class 6A championship. He was a Class 6A All-State first team pick and was named Pennsylvania Gatorade Player of the Year. He averaged 21.6 points, 11.8 rebounds, and 3.1 blocks per game playing for ITPS Wildcats Select on the Adidas Gauntlet. Tshiebwe played in the McDonald's All-American Game and Nike Hoop Summit.

Recruiting
He was considered a five-star recruit by Rivals and 247Sports and a four-star recruit by ESPN. On October 20, 2018, he committed to play college basketball for West Virginia.

College career

West Virginia

In his second college game, Tshiebwe had a double-double with 20 points and 17 rebounds at Pittsburgh. As a result, he was named Big 12 Newcomer of the Week. Tshiebwe had 19 points and 18 rebounds against Wichita State in the Cancun Challenge championship game, leading his team to victory and earning MVP honors. He was again named Big 12 Newcomer of the Week on December 2, 2019. At the conclusion of the regular season, Tshiebwe was named to the Second Team All-Big 12 and the All-Newcomer Team. Tshiebwe averaged 11.2 points and 9.3 rebounds per game as a freshman while shooting 55% from the field.

As a sophomore, he averaged 8.5 points and 7.8 rebounds through 10 games before leaving West Virginia for personal reasons.

Kentucky
On January 10, 2021, Tshiebwe transferred to Kentucky, after considering Miami, NC State and Illinois. In his debut for Kentucky, Tshiebwe tallied 17 points and 20 rebounds in a 79–71 loss to Duke. On December 22, he scored 14 points and grabbed a Rupp Arena-record 28 rebounds in a 95–60 win against Western Kentucky.

At the close of the season, Tshiebwe was named the Sporting News National Player of the Year, as well as the unanimous Southeastern Conference Player of the Year.

Career statistics

College

|-
| style="text-align:left;"| 2019–20
| style="text-align:left;"| West Virginia
| 31 || 31 || 23.2 || .552 || .000 || .708 || 9.3 || .4 || .7 || 1.0 || 11.2
|-
| style="text-align:left;"| 2020–21
| style="text-align:left;"| West Virginia
| 10 || 10 || 19.9 || .523 || .000 || .607 || 7.8 || .7 || .4 || .4 || 8.5
|-
| style="text-align:left;"| 2021–22
| style="text-align:left;"| Kentucky
| 34 || 34 || 30.6 || .602 || .000 || .699 || 15.1 || 1.1 || 2.0 || 1.4 || 17.4
|- class="sortbottom"
| style="text-align:center;" colspan="2"| Career
| 66 || 66 || 25.5 || .573 || .000 || .695 || 11.3 || .7 || 1.2 || 1.1 || 12.8

Off the court

Personal life
Tshiebwe is a Christian. After Tshiebwe began attending Kennedy Catholic High School, Jeff Kollar and his wife, who live near the school, became his legal guardians. Kollar and his wife were previously guardians of brothers Mohamed and Sagaba Konate, who both played basketball for Kennedy Catholic. Sagaba Konate also played college basketball for West Virginia.

Tshiebwe is a Kentucky Colonel.

Business interests 
Tshiebwe has become a leading figure in name, image, and likeness (NIL) deals, despite being unable to take full advantage of his celebrity due to holding a student visa. While he is allowed to sign sponsorship deals, he cannot make paid personal appearances (including autograph signings and commercial shoots) while in the U.S. with that visa status. Tshiebwe's advisers are currently trying to change his visa status to "extraordinary ability", which would enable him to fully monetize his celebrity. In August 2022, he was temporarily freed from the restrictions of his visa when the Wildcats went on a week-long preseason exhibition tour to The Bahamas. When the team's plane landed in The Bahamas, Tshiebwe's first phone call was reportedly to his agent, asking "Where do you need me?", and he did promotional work for four companies before fully settling into his hotel room. During the Wildcats' down time on that tour, Tshiebwe made numerous photo shoots and advertising reads, and signed large quantities of memorabilia. UK head coach John Calipari was apparently unfazed by Tshiebwe's off-court work in The Bahamas, reportedly telling The Athletic, "He can’t do this stuff in the States. Oscar, you weren’t there today, but we all get why you’re doing what you’re doing." By the end of the tour, he had reportedly made $500,000, bringing his total NIL money to $2.75 million in about 6 months. He used his first batch of NIL money to buy his mother a five-bedroom house, and has established a charitable foundation for the benefit of children in his homeland that is funded in large part by his NIL deals.

References

External links
Kentucky Wildcats bio
West Virginia Mountaineers bio

1999 births
Living people
All-American college men's basketball players
Centers (basketball)
Democratic Republic of the Congo expatriate basketball people in the United States
Democratic Republic of the Congo men's basketball players
Kentucky Wildcats men's basketball players
McDonald's High School All-Americans
People from Lubumbashi
Power forwards (basketball)
West Virginia Mountaineers men's basketball players